National Secondary Route 220, or just Route 220 (or ) is a National Road Route of Costa Rica, located in the San José, Heredia provinces.

Description
In San José province the route covers Vázquez de Coronado canton (Patalillo district), Moravia canton (La Trinidad district).

In Heredia province the route covers Santo Domingo canton (San Miguel, Paracito, Pará districts).

References

Highways in Costa Rica